William Noyes may refer to:
 William Noyes (priest) (1568–1622), Anglican clergyman of Puritan teachings
 William A. Noyes (1857–1941), American analytical and organic chemist
 W. Albert Noyes Jr. (1898–1980), his son, American chemist
 William W. Noyes (1846–1910), American Civil War soldier and Medal of Honor recipient
 William Curtis Noyes (1805–1864), American jurist.
 William Leslie Noyes (1836–1908), American farmer and politician from New York